The Valiant is an epithet bestowed on:

People
Bolesław I the Brave (967-1025), first King of Poland
Edgar, King of Scotland (c. 1074-1107), nicknamed Probus (the Valiant)
Maurice de Berkeley, 4th Baron Berkeley (c. 1330-1368)
Muhammad XIII, Sultan of Granada (c. 1444–c. 1494) 
Pharasmanes II of Iberia (died 138), a king of Iberia
Theodoric II, Duke of Lorraine (died 1115)

Fictional and legendary characters
Halfdan the Valiant, a legendary figure in Norse sagas
the title character of János vitéz ("John the Valiant"), an 1845 Hungarian epic poem
Lucy Pevensie, co-ruler of the fictional land of Narnia as Queen Lucy the Valiant
Volstagg, a character in the Marvel Comics universe

See also
List of people known as the Brave
List of people known as the Courageous
List of people known as the Fearless

Lists of people by epithet